The Falange Española de las Juntas de Ofensiva Nacional Sindicalista (FE de las JONS), was a fascist political party founded in Spain in 1934 as merger of the Falange Española and the Juntas de Ofensiva Nacional-Sindicalista. FE de las JONS, which became the main Fascist group during the Second Spanish Republic, ceased to exist as such when, during the Civil War, General Francisco Franco merged it with the Traditionalist Communion in April 1937 to form the similarly named Falange Española Tradicionalista y de las JONS (FET y de las JONS).

History

Early history 
In 1934, Falange Española (FE) merged with the Juntas de Ofensiva Nacional-Sindicalista (JONS) of Onésimo Redondo and Ramiro Ledesma, becoming the 'Falange Española de las Juntas de Ofensiva Nacional Sindicalista'. During and after the 1933 election campaign, members of both the Falange and JONS had been killed; on 9 February 1934, Matías Montero was murdered while selling Falangist newspapers, becoming a martyr for the small movement. By June 1934 ten of them were dead, killed primarily by the Socialists but also with an anarchist contribution; the Socialists had no intention of allowing a fascist movement to develop in Spain, fearing such a movement would crush them as had happened in Germany and Italy. The Falangists initially fought back ineffectively (resulting in their being ridiculed by the rest of the political right) but eventually they formed their own death squads. After the tenth fascist, Juan Cuéllar, was killed and had his corpse abused in Madrid on 10 June 1934 during a confrontation with socialists, the Falangists attacked a group of Socialist Youth, killing a young woman, Juanita Rico, who was alleged to have abused the corpse, and seriously wounding two other socialists. Rico received a large funeral and was hailed as "the first victim of fascism in Spain." Rico's killers seemed to have acted on their own initiative without informing their superiors and an escalation of violence soon followed; José Antonio had to put his foot down to prevent some Falangists from assassinating Indalecio Prieto and from blowing up the Socialists' headquarters in Madrid.

The party was initially organised as a triumvirate formed by Ramiro Ledesma, Ruiz de Alda and José Antonio Primo de Rivera, while the secondary General Secretary position was given to Raimundo Fernández-Cuesta. It attracted a considerable number of prominent intellectuals, including Pedro Mourlane Michelena, Rafael Sánchez Mazas, Ernesto Giménez Caballero, Eugenio Montes, José María Alfaro, Agustín de Foxa, Luys Santa Marina, Samuel Ros, Jacinto Miquelarena and Dionisio Ridruejo.

 has recognised at least four different ideological strands within the Falange, a somewhat ecumenical party, from the fusion until the expulsion of Ledesma: conservatism espoused by monarchists such as Francisco Moreno Herrera, marquis of Eliseda; the authoritarian Catholicism of Onésimo Redondo; the radical (and anti-clerical) national syndicalism of Ramiro Ledesma; and the distinctive elitist regenerationism of José Antonio Primo de Rivera.

In October 1934, the direction unified under a Jefe Nacional (National Chief) in the person of José Antonio and developed the political program known as "the 27 Points".

In November 1934, the marquis of Eliseda, a financial backer of the party, left the Falange over disagreements with party proposals in regards to state-church relations, which he deemed "frankly heretical". His departure left the party without its main income and propaganda apparatus.

Inner tensions over the draft of the political program continued. The power struggle between Ramiro Ledesma, who espoused a radical and anti-capitalist vision; and José Antonio Primo de Rivera, who held a more conservative and aristocratic one, eventually led to the expulsion of Ledesma in January 1935. The party also had difficulties in achievimg in economic solvency. Although, in principle, it received support from large financiers and landowners, this was not enough until in 1935, it was subsidized monthly with 50,000 lire by the Italian Fascist regime. The subsidy was reduced by half and withdrawn after the poor electoral results of 1936. 

The party was republican, modernist, championed the lower classes and opposed both oligarchy and communism, but it never garnered the kind of popular following demonstrated by fascist movements elsewhere in Europe. For these reasons, the Falange was shunned by other right-leaning parties in the Spanish general election of 1936. It received just 0.7% of the vote and did not win a single seat in the Cortes. It only surpassed one percent of the vote in five provinces, performing best in the provinces of Valladolid and Cadiz, where it received between 4% and 5%. Having likely never exceeded ten thousand members in the early 1930s, the Falange lost supporters in the run-up to the Spanish Civil War, leaving a core of young, dedicated activists, many in the organization's student organization, the Sindicato Español Universitario. The Falangist program was heavily influenced by Catholicism but the party desired a separation between church and state; the Falange had no intention of forcing Catholicism upon millions of Spanish non-believers. The Falangist were in some ways anti-conservative, as while most of the Spanish conservative right refused any reform and defended private property at all levels, the Falange favoured some nationalisations (such as banking and public services), as well as economic and social reform; the Falange defended "legitimate" productive capitalism while denouncing what they regarded usurious, financial and speculative capitalism. This view was compatible with private property but not with the abuses perpetrate against the lower classes, whom the Falange believed should be saved from the misery in which they lived (referring specifically to landless peasants and day labourers). The party thus did not desire a left-wing revolution but poverty alleviation and to end class struggle by using a new, vertical, syndicalist structure under the Falange. The party desired to attract people from all social classes, whether or not they had been members of left-wing organisations; the Falange viewed conflict between political parties as a consequence of liberalism and democracy. They hoped this unification would make Spain powerful again and allow Spain to launch further imperial acquisitions. However, historian Stanley Payne argues that the Falange had no desire to actually conquer territory (with de Rivera viewing the age of conquest as at an end) but instead their idea of an empire actually meant increasing Spanish cultural power, particularly in Latin America where Spain could act as a kind of Hispanic cultural leader. There was also the prospect of forming a type of federation with Portugal.

The party had a militia, the Primera Línea,  and it had a detailed training manual, probably prepared by the retired Lieutenant Colonel Luis Arrendondo, which carried instructions for guerilla warfare. While the Falange was not prepared for such a serious activity at the time, the document was well-publicised and convinced the Spanish Left that fascism was a serious threat in Spain. The Falange also had its own intelligence service, the Servicio de Información del Movimiento. The group had access to a variety of weapons, firearms and explosives. A few months before the war began, several artillery officers began providing military training to Falangist militants. 

The Falange's male membership was accompanied by a female auxiliary, the Sección Femenina. Led by the José Antonio's sister Pilar, this latter subsidiary organization claimed more than a half million members by the end of the civil war and provided nursing and support services for the Nationalist forces. During the spring of 1936, when police persecution of the Falange (including the Women's Section) was at its height, the organisation was described by Rivera as the only Falangist section that was still largely intact and it proved crucial in the reorganisation of the Falange into a true underground movement. The Women's Section raised money for Falangist prisoners and their families and distributed clandestine propaganda, as well as carrying messages from imprisoned leaders to outside militants.

Following the 1936 elections, more violence erupted between the Falange and its enemies. While Rivera initially thought that the new government might implement the "national revolution" and ordered his militants to abstain from hostile acts against the government, it was not to last. On 6 March four members of the Falangist trade union, CONS, who failed to support a leftist strike were killed. On 11 March, two law students, one Falangist and the other Carlist, were shot to death, allegedly by the Socialist Youth. Since there had been six Falange-affiliated deaths in five days, the Falange retaliated and on 13 March, several fascist gunman attempted to kill Luis Jiménez de Asúa, a well-known Socialist leader and law professor who was also one of the authors of the Republican Constitution. While he survived, a member of his police escort was fatally wounded. On 16 April, Falangists opened fire with submachineguns against workers in the centre of Madrid, killing three and wounding forty. During the Popular Front government, sixty-seven Falangists were killed, compared to forty-one during the previous two years. In turn, the Falange killed sixty-four leftists, mostly socialists and communists. To survive against increased government persecution, the movement adopted a communist style cell structure of three members per cell. One of the reasons the organisation survived was due to a large influx of new members, with 15,000 members of the CEDA youth organisation, JAP, joining the Falange (though this was a small number compared to JAP's total membership of 225,000).

The left-wing Popular Front government persecuted the Falange and imprisoned the Marqués de Estella on 6 July 1936. In turn, the Falange joined the conspiracy to overthrow the Second Spanish Republic, supporting the military revolt ultimately led by Francisco Franco and continuing to do so throughout the ensuing Spanish Civil War.

Spanish Civil War 

With the eruption of the Civil War in July 1936, the Falange fought on the side of the Nationalist faction against the Second Spanish Republic, expanding rapidly from several thousand to several hundred thousand. Many people joined the Falange out of fear of persecution - former leftists and centrists rushed to join and tried to avert suspicion of their loyalties by being more fascist than the actual fascists. The massive influx of opportunists swamped the "old shirts" - nearly half of the pre-war veterans had died during the initial stages of the rebellion and several of its key leaders were either dead or captured, thus the swollen membership proved extremely awkward for the organisation.

The Falange, through its leader and co-founder, José Antonio Primo de Rivera, collaborated in the different conspiracies and military attempts to overthrow the Republic. In the last months, with the conspiracy that would lead to the uprising that was already underway, and with the Falange virtually excluded, Primo de Rivera was actively trying to get it to play a more decisive role. In contact with the conspirators from the prison of Alicante, where he was imprisoned, he alternated communiqués begging for a prompt uprising, with conditions to join the conspiracy that the military did not meet. Finally, an announcement on July 17 called on his organizations to join the coup, accepting an auxiliary role. The command of the party rested upon Manuel Hedilla, a former mechanic, as many of the first generation leaders were dead or incarcerated by the Republicans. Among them was Primo de Rivera, who was a government prisoner. As a result, he was referred to among the leadership as el Ausente, ("the Absent One"). After being sentenced to death on 18 November 1936, José Antonio Primo de Rivera was executed on 20 November 1936 (a date since known as 20-N in Spain) in a Republican prison, giving him martyr status among the Falangists. This conviction and sentence was possible because he had lost his parliamentary immunity after his party did not have enough votes during the last elections. Hedilla played an important role in seizing the town of Corunna, bringing in well-armed Falangists to help rebels secure the town and partaking in some of the worst repression of the war there. Yet he later became one of the most outspoken critics of nationalist killings, arguing it alienated the workers from their cause - on Christmas Eve 1936 he told the Falange not to persecute workers who had "voted for the left out of hunger or despair. We all know that in many towns there were - and are - right-wingers who are worse than the reds." These statements, however, made Hedilla and other left-wing Falangists highly suspect in the eyes of the Spanish right. Tension arose between the left and right wings of the Falange and the German ambassador encouraged Hedilla to resist the middle-class take over of the organisation. On the night of the 16th of April 1937, Hedilla's followers (though not Hedilla himself) attempted to seize the Falangist's headquarters in Salamanca from the rightists led by Sancho Dávila, resulting in a gun battle around the Plaza Mayor that left two Falangists dead and order had to be restored by the Civil Guard. On 18 April, Hedilla arranged a meeting at the Falange council in which he was elected leader.

After Francisco Franco seized power on 19 April 1937, he united under his command the Falange with the Carlist Comunión Tradicionalista with the Unification Decree, forming the Falange Española Tradicionalista y de las JONS (FET y de las JONS), whose official ideology was the Falangists' 27 puntos—reduced after the unification to 26. While the Carlists came off worse in this forced union, Franco had correctly deduced that they would be more obedient and less politically minded, making it less of a concern. Despite this, the party was in fact a wide-ranging nationalist coalition, closely controlled by Franco. Parts of the original Falange (including Hedilla) and many Carlists did not join the unified party. Franco had sought to control the Falange after a clash between Hedilla and his main critics within the group, the legitimistas of Agustín Aznar and Sancho Dávila y Fernández de Celis, that threatened to derail the Nationalist war effort. The new uniform consisted of the Carlist red beret and the Falangist blue shirt. While the Falange was increasingly integrated into the Nationalist military, it did manage to maintain its own identity; their uniforms and correspondence maintained their own Falangist insignia, while the traditional term presente! was used to refer to fallen comrades in reports and logs.

None of the vanquished parties in the war suffered such a toll of deaths among their leaders as did the Falange. 60% of the pre-war Falangist membership lost their lives in the war.

However, most of the property of all other parties and trade unions were assigned to the party. In 1938, all trade unions were unified under Falangist command.

Francoist Spain

Notes

References

Bibliography 
 
 
 
 
 
 
 
 

Far-right political parties in Spain
Defunct political parties in Spain
Political parties established in 1934
Political parties disestablished in 1937
Falangist parties
Fascist parties in Spain
Catholic political parties
Political parties of the Spanish Civil War
20th century in Spain
Political history of Spain
Spanish nationalism
National syndicalism